Live at the Olympia is the first live album by Damien Dempsey, released in 2006. The recording is taken from a live performance at Dublin's Olympia Theater on 15 December 2005.

The album was released as it was recorded live on the night, without the addition of any overdubs.

Tracks
 "Patience"
 "Party On"
 "Hold Me"
 "Seize the Day"
 "Not On Your Own Tonight"
 "Apple Of My Eye"
 "Sing All Our Cares Away"
 "Negative Vibes"
 "Industrial School"
 "It's All Good"

Encore:
 "Factories"
 "Colony"

Chart performance 
The album debuted on the Irish Albums Chart at #10, and remained in the top 75 for six weeks.

References 

2000 albums
Damien Dempsey albums